Delphax is a genus of mostly European planthoppers, typical of the family Delphacidae.

Species
The Global Biodiversity Information Facility lists:
 Delphax alachanicus Anufriev, 1970
 Delphax angulicornis (Latreille, 1807)
 Delphax armeniacus Anufriev, 1970
 Delphax caliginea Stål, 1854
 Delphax conspersinervis Lethierry, 1890
 Delphax crassicornis (Panzer, 1796)
 Delphax dorsatus (Melichar, 1905)
 Delphax gilveola (Kirschbaum, 1868)
 Delphax hemiptera Germar, 1818
 Delphax horvathi (Lallemand, 1925)
 Delphax inermis Ribaut, 1934
 Delphax maritima Anufriev, 1977
 Delphax meridionalis (Haupt, 1924)
 Delphax modesta Fieber, 1866
 Delphax narbonensis (Ribaut, 1934)
 Delphax orientalis (Linnavuori, 1955)
 Delphax pakistanica Mushtaq, 1998-01
 Delphax productus (Walker, 1851)
 Delphax pulchellus (Curtis, 1833)
 Delphax radiata Costa, 1835
 Delphax rhenana Statz, 1950
 Delphax ribautiana Asche & Drosopoulos, 1982
 Delphax senilis Scudder, 1877
 Delphax setosus (Germar, 1830)
 Delphax stigmaticalis Curtis, 1837
 Delphax substituta Walker, 1851
 Delphax tenae (Muir, 1926)
 Delphax veterum Cockerell, 1921
 Delphax vicaria Walker, 1851

References

External links

Delphacidae
Auchenorrhyncha genera